Mert Ilıman (born 8 October 1995) is a Turkish footballer who plays as a left back for Beyoğlu Yeni Çarşı. He can also play as a midfielder, or winger. He is a product of the Bursaspor youth academy.

References

External links
 
 
 

1995 births
People from Çorum
Living people
Turkish footballers
Association football defenders
Bursaspor footballers
Fatih Karagümrük S.K. footballers
Kayserispor footballers
Büyükşehir Belediye Erzurumspor footballers
24 Erzincanspor footballers
Kahramanmaraşspor footballers
Süper Lig players
TFF Second League players
TFF Third League players